Oberweis may refer to:
Oberweis, Germany, in Rhineland-Palatinate
Oberweis Dairy, a dairy in North Aurora, Illinois
Jim Oberweis (born 1946), American businessman, investment manager, and Illinois politician